Wesselman Woods Nature Preserve is a  nature preserve located in Evansville, Indiana. It is a National Natural Landmark and a State Nature Preserve owned by the City of Evansville and operated by the non-profit Wesselman Nature Society.

The woods consist of sweetgum, sugar maple, tulip tree, Shumard oak, and green ash throughout. It is the largest tract of virgin forest located inside any city limits in the United States.

The oldest trees are over 400 years old. Among the largest of their species are 24 state champions and two national champion trees. One of the tallest trees in the state is a tulip tree located within the park.

Animal species include squirrels, raccoons, gray foxes, coyote, and whitetail deer. The woods also serves as a refuge for a variety of woodpeckers and owls.

A nature center welcomes visitors with interactive exhibits, animals, special events, wildlife observation areas, educational programs, summer camps, and a  nature playscape. The woods offer a variety of hiking trails of varying distances. The amphitheater near Odonata Pond may also be rented for outdoor activities.

The Wesselman Nature Society also manages Howell Wetlands, a  wetlands property located at 1400 S. Tekoppel Avenue in the urban western area of Evansville.

The Wandering Owl 
The Wandering Owl is an annual fall fundraiser held since 2009 in Wesselman Woods with all proceeds going towards Wesselman Wood. It is a 21-and-older event that features food, beer, wine, and live acoustic music, supposed by local businesses.

References

External links
Wesselman Nature Society official site
Wesselman Park Woods National Park Service

Evansville, Indiana
Geography of Evansville, Indiana
Nature reserves in Indiana
Parks in Southwestern Indiana
National Natural Landmarks in Indiana
Nature centers in Indiana
Tourist attractions in Evansville, Indiana
Protected areas of Vanderburgh County, Indiana